David Arugete (3 April 1921 – 1 December 1968), commonly known under his stage name Darío Moreno, was a Turkish-Jewish polyglot singer, an accomplished composer, lyricist, and guitarist. He attained fame and made a remarkable career centred in France which also included films, during the 1950s and the 1960s. He became famous with his 1961 song Brigitte Bardot.

Biography

Darío Moreno was born to a large Jewish family. He was orphaned in early childhood when his father, who worked in a train station in Aydın, was shot dead under tragic circumstances. He was placed in the Sephardic orphanage of Izmir (Nido De Guerfanos) by his mother and remained there until he was four.

After a primary education in the Jewish educational establishments of Izmir, he had many odd jobs during his early youth. He put great effort into continuing his education while simultaneously working to make a living. He started working as an errand boy in the law firm of the city's prominent lawyers, and he was eventually trained to become a clerk in the office. In the evenings, he would study French in Izmir's Central Library. With a guitar that had fallen into his hands by chance, he also learned to play the guitar, mainly on his own with occasional tutoring from acquaintances.

He started singing at Bar Mitzva celebrations as a second job. In his early twenties, he had already become a well-known singer in Izmir, and particularly among the Jewish community. During his military service in the Turkish Army, he was employed as a singer in officers' quarters in various garrisons and became more focused on music. His first truly professional musical performance started in his hometown right after his discharge, and was arranged through connections established while in the army. When he started making money with his music, he moved to the better-off Jewish quarter of Karataş to a house in a street leading to the historical building of Asansör, one of the city's landmarks (and which literally means the "Elevator", people taking an actual elevator to go to the higher part of the quarter, this part being separated by the coastal strait with a steep slope). Nowadays, this street is named Dario Moreno Sokağı (Dario Moreno Street) in his legacy.

A hyperactive personality, Darío Moreno died of a heart attack resulting from a discussion between him and an airport gate staff in the Atatürk Airport. He was slightly late for one of his flights, on his way to Paris for a concert. He was also planning to attend the first "Turkish Night" planned to take place in Paris. The airport gate staff discretionary did not allow him to board the plane and this led to a serious debate which resulted in Moreno's heart attack.  He was only 47. According to his will he wanted to be buried in İzmir, Turkey, but he was buried in Holon, Israel, by his mother Madam Roza.

Ya Mustafa

Ya Mustafa is one of the most remembered of Moreno's songs. It was very famous in the 1950s and early 1960s. The original version of this catchy song and the identity of its composer are disputed. It appeared in one of the films of the Egyptian actor Ismail Yassin in the 1950s, and in another Egyptian film of Sabah from the same era. Dario Moreno performed it in the late 1950s. In Europe, the song became popular with the help of Bob Azzam (a Lebanese singer who was born in Egypt in 1925 and died in Monte Carlo in 2004), who released it in 1960 in France with lyrics consisting of at least 3 languages: "Chérie je t'aime, chéri je t'adore – come la salsa del pomodoro" (Darling, I love you, darling, I adore you – like tomato sauce). Bruno Gigliotti, (Orlando) the brother of famous singer Dalida, also covered the song. This song, with its polyglotic lyrics, can be considered a historical documentation of the cosmopolitan era in the Egyptian city of Alexandria. During that era, a large cosmopolitan polyglotic community, mainly Turks, Greeks, Jews, Armenians and Italians, lived in the Egyptian city. A sizable portion lived in the Attareen district, where the events of the song take place.

Films

 No Vacation for Mr. Mayor (1951) – Le maharadjah
 Deux de l'escadrille (1953)
 Le salaire de la peur (1952) (by Henri-Georges Clouzot with Yves Montand, Charles Vanel and Peter van Eyck) – Hernandez
 Rires de Paris (1953)
 La môme vert-de-gris (1953) (by Bernard Borderie with Eddie Constantine, Howard Vernon, Dominique Wilms and Maurice Ronet) – Joe Madrigal
 Quay of Blondes (1954) (by Paul Cadéac with Michel Auclair) – Lucky
 The Women Couldn't Care Less (1954) – Perera, the Head Waiter
 The Sheep Has Five Legs (1954) – Un matelot américain
 Pardonnez nos offenses (1956)
 Burning Fuse (1957) – Jeff
 Œil pour œil (1957) – Le cafetier de Toluma
 Anyone Can Kill Me (1957, by Henri Decoin with Anouk Aimée) – Luigi Falconi
 Incognito (1958) – Fernando
 La femme et le Pantin (1959) (by Julien Duvivier with Brigitte Bardot) – Arabadjian
 Oh! que mambo (1959) (by John Berry with Magali Noël) – Miguel Montero
 Marie of the Isles (1959) (by Georges Combret with Belinda Lee) – Desmarais – le traître
 Nathalie, Secret Agent (1959) – Docteur Alberto / Don José
 Voulez-vous danser avec moi ? (1959) (by Michel Boisrond with Henri Vidal, Brigitte Bardot and Noël Roquevert) – Florès
 Touchez pas aux blondes (1960) – Rodinoff
 Candide ou l'Optimisme au XXe siècle (1960) (by Norbert Carbonnaux with Jean-Pierre Cassel and Daliah Lavi) – Un dictateur sud américain / South American Dictator
 The Revolt of the Slaves (1960) – Massimiano
 Tintin et le mystère de la toison d'or (1961) (by Jean-Jacques Vierne with Charles Vanel and Georges Wilson) – Midas Papos
 Le tout pour le tout (1962) (by Patrice Dally with Karen Blanguernon and Dirk Sanders)
 The Merry Widow (1962) – Camillo, Valenciennes Mann
 El hub keda (1962)
 Les femmes d'abord (1963) – L'aubergiste
 No temas a la ley (1963) – Bruno Suárez
 Le bon Roi Dagobert (1963) (by Pierre Chevalier with Fernandel and Gino Cervi) – Charibert – le frère de Dagobert
 Le dernier tiercé (1964) – Guido
 Dis-moi qui tuer (1965) – Pitou
 Hotel Paradiso (1966) – The Turk
 Le Saint prend l'affût (1966)
 La Prisonnière (1968) – Sala (final film role)

Albums
 Granada- Adios Amigos
 Bossa Nova
 Calypso
 Le coco
 Canım İzmir
 Si Tu Vas A Rio / Viens
 Long Bos
 Moreno Poy poy
 Mulata Ye Ye Ye
 Hatıralar Hayal Oldu / Olam Boyun Kurbanı
 Tropical Dario
 Oh Que Dario

Awards
 1958 Grand Prix Du Disque in France

See also
Avrasya Anı Evi

References

External links
 

1921 births
Smyrniote Jews
20th-century Turkish male singers
Turkish composers
Turkish male film actors
Turkish Jews
20th-century Sephardi Jews
1968 deaths
Jewish singers
Jewish composers
Arts in İzmir
People from Aydın
Jewish male actors
20th-century Turkish male actors
20th-century composers
Turkish expatriates in France
 Turkish people of Italian descent